Obadiah Smith House is a historic home located at Kings Park in Suffolk County, New York.  It was built about 1708 and is a two-story, heavy timber frame, five-bay center entrance dwelling, with a side gable roof and interior end chimneys.  It is operated as a house museum by the Smithtown Historical Society.

It was added to the National Register of Historic Places in 1996.

References

External links

Photo of the Obadiah Smith House in 2013

Houses on the National Register of Historic Places in New York (state)
Historic American Buildings Survey in New York (state)
Federal architecture in New York (state)
Historic house museums in New York (state)
Houses completed in the 18th century
Historical society museums in New York (state)
Museums in Suffolk County, New York
Houses in Suffolk County, New York
National Register of Historic Places in Suffolk County, New York